St Aidan's Academy may refer to:

St Aidan's Catholic Academy, a Roman Catholic secondary school in Sunderland, Tyne and Wear, England
St Aidan's Church of England Academy, a Church of England secondary school in Darlington, County Durham, England

See also
St. Aidan's School (disambiguation)